The Wilmington Pirates were a minor league baseball team located in Wilmington, North Carolina. From 1928 to 1929, they played in the Class D Eastern Carolina League. From 1932 to 1935, they played in the Class B Piedmont League. From 1946 to 1950, they played in the Class D Tobacco State League.

Year-by-year record

References

Defunct minor league baseball teams
Sports in Wilmington, North Carolina
1928 establishments in North Carolina
1950 disestablishments in North Carolina
Baseball teams established in 1928
Baseball teams disestablished in 1950
Professional baseball teams in North Carolina
Defunct baseball teams in North Carolina
Piedmont League teams
Tobacco State League teams
Eastern Carolina League teams